Shmel may refer to:
RPO-A Shmel (Bumblebee), rocket flamethrower
3M6 Shmel, guided anti-tank missile
Beriev A-50 Shmel airborne early warning (AEW) aircraft, or its Russian radar